The Opelika Owls were a Minor League Baseball team that represented Opelika, Alabama in the Georgia–Alabama League from 1946 to 1951.

External links
Baseball Reference

Lee County, Alabama
Baseball teams established in 1913
Sports clubs disestablished in 1951
Professional baseball teams in Alabama
Defunct Georgia-Alabama League teams
1913 establishments in Alabama
1914 disestablishments in Alabama
1946 establishments in Alabama
1951 disestablishments in Alabama
Defunct baseball teams in Alabama
Baseball teams disestablished in 1951